A women's college is an institution of higher education where enrollment is all-female. In the United States, almost all women's colleges are private undergraduate institutions, with many offering coeducational graduate programs. In other countries, laws and traditions vary.

Africa

Somaliland
 Barwaaqo University, Baliga cas, Somaliland (est. 2017)

Sudan
 Ahfad University for Women, Omdurman
 Sudan University College for Women, Khartoum

Zimbabwe
 Women's University in Africa, Harare (co-ed since unknown, Wikipedia page lists enrollment policy as 80% women and 20% men)

Asia

Bangladesh
 Asian University for Women, Chittagong

China
 China Women's University, Beijing
 Shandong Women's University, Jinan
 Hunan Women's University, Changsha
 Ginling Women's University, Nanjing (renamed Ginling College in 1927 and merged with the University of Nanking in 1951)
 Guangdong Women's Polytechnic College, Guangzhou
 Zhejiang Women's College, Hangzhou
 Hebei Women's Vocational College, Shijiazhuang
 Fujian Hwa Nan Women's College, Fuzhou

India
 Mody University, Sikar
 Lady Shri Ram College
 Miranda House
 Lady Hardinge Medical College
 Indira Gandhi Delhi Technical University for Women
 Women's College, Aligarh Muslim University
 Assam Women's University
 Bhagat Phool Singh Mahila Vishwavidyalaya
 Banasthali University
 Jayoti Vidyapeeth Women's University
 Karnataka State Women's University
 Mother Teresa Women's University
 Rama Devi Women's University
 SNDT Women's University
 Sri Padmavati Mahila Visvavidyalayam
 Avinashilingam Institute for Home Science and Higher Education for Women
  Gargi college for women
 MKSSS, Maharshi Karve Stree Shikshan Samstha, Pune

West Bengal
 Kanyashree University
 Diamond Harbour Women's University

Indonesia
 International Women University, Bandung

Japan

Pakistan

Azad Kashmir
 Women University of Azad Jammu & Kashmir in Bagh, Azad Kashmir

Balochistan
 Sardar Bahadur Khan Women's University in Quetta

Islamabad Capital Territory
 Women's Institute of Science & Humanities in Islamabad

Khyber Pakhtunkhwa

Peshawar
 Jinnah College for Women in Peshawar
 Shaheed Benazir Bhutto Women University in Peshawar

Mardan
 Women University Mardan in Mardan

Swabi
 Women University Swabi in Swabi

Punjab

Bahawalpur
 Government Sadiq College Women University in Bahawalpur

Faisalabad
 Government College Women University Faisalabad in Faisalabad

Lahore
 Fatima Jinnah Medical University in Lahore
 Kinnaird College for Women University in Lahore
 Lahore College for Women University in Lahore

Multan
 Women University Multan in Multan

Rawalpindi
 Fatima Jinnah Women University in Rawalpindi
 Rawalpindi Women University in Rawalpindi

Sialkot
 Government College Women University Sialkot in Sialkot

Sindh

Karachi
 Jinnah University for Women in Karachi
 Government Elementary College of Education in Karachi

Sukkur
 Begum Nusrat Bhutto Women University in Sukkur

Philippines 
 Philippine Women's University (co-ed since unknown)

South Korea
 Ewha Womans University, Seoul
 Sookmyung Women's University, Seoul
 Dongduk Women's University, Seoul
 Duksung Women's University, Seoul
 Sungshin Women's University, Seoul
 Seoul Women's University, Seoul
 Baewha Women's University, Seoul
 Hanyang Women's University, Seoul
 Former
 Hansung Woman's University, Seoul (co-ed since 1978)
 Soodo Women Teachers' College, Seoul (co-ed and renamed Sejong university since 1979)
 Sangmyung Women's University, Seoul (co-ed since 1996)
 Songsim Women's College, Bucheon (merged with Catholic College in 1995; co-ed since 1995)
 Hyosung Women's College, Daegu (merged with Catholic College of Daegu in 1995; co-ed since 1995)
 Armed Forces Nursing Academy, Daejeon (co-ed since 2012)

Europe

United Kingdom

England
 Bedford College, University of London (co-ed since 1965; merged with Royal Holloway in 1985)
 Girton College, University of Cambridge (co-ed since 1979)
 Lady Margaret Hall, University of Oxford, Oxford (co-ed since 1979)
 Lucy Cavendish College, University of Cambridge (co-ed since 2020)
 Murray Edwards College, University of Cambridge (mixed-sex Fellowship)
 Newnham College, University of Cambridge
 Royal Holloway, University of London (co-ed since 1965; merged with Bedford College in 1985) 
 Hughes Hall, University of Cambridge (co-ed since 1973)
 Somerville College, University of Oxford (co-ed since 1994)
 St Aidan's College, Durham University, Durham (co-ed since 1981)
 St Anne's College, University of Oxford (co-ed since 1979)
 St Hilda's College, University of Oxford (co-ed since 2008)
 St Hild's College, Durham University (co-ed since merged with the College of the Venerable Bede in 1975)
 St Hugh's College, University of Oxford (co-ed since 1986)
 St Mary's College, Durham University (co-ed since 2005)
 Trevelyan College, Durham University (co-ed since 1992)
 Westfield College, University of London, Hampstead (1882: co-ed since 1968; merged with Queen Mary's College in 1989)
 Queen Elizabeth College, London (co-ed since 1953; merged with King's College London in 1985)
 Hillcroft College, Surbiton (1920: as the National Residential College for Women; co-ed since merger to form Richmond and Hillcroft Adult Community College in 2017)

Scotland
 Edinburgh School of Medicine for Women, Edinburgh (1886: closed in 1898)
 Edinburgh College of Medicine for Women, Edinburgh (1889: co-ed since merger with main medical schools in 1916)

North America

Canada

Nova Scotia
 Mount Saint Vincent University, Halifax (co-ed since 1967)

Ontario
 Brescia University College, London (affiliated with the co-educational University of Western Ontario)
 Ewart College, Toronto (merged with Knox College of the University of Toronto in 1990)

United States

Middle East

Iran
 Alzahra University, Tehran
 Refah University College, Tehran

Saudi Arabia
All universities in Saudi Arabia must have a separate campus for women. Men are not allowed to study or work at female campuses, with the exception of King Abdullah University of Science and Technology. There is one women's university, without a male campus, which is:
 Princess Nora bint Abdul Rahman University

United Arab Emirates
 Abu Dhabi Women's College, Abu Dhabi
 Al Ain Women's College, Al Ain
 Dubai Women's College, Dubai
 Fujairah Women's College, Fujairah
 Ras Al Khaimah Women's College, Ras Al Khaimah
 Sharjah Women's College, Sharjah
 Zayed University, Abu Dhabi and Dubai
 Dubai Medical College for Girls
 Dubai Pharmacy College

Oceania

Australia

New South Wales
 The Women's College, University of Sydney

Queensland
 Women's College, University of Queensland, St Lucia
 Duschesne College, University of Queensland, St Lucia
 Grace College, University of Queensland, St Lucia

Victoria
 St Hilda's College, University of Melbourne (co-ed since 1973)
 University College, University of Melbourne (co-ed since 1975)

South America

Peru 
 UNIFE, Universidad Femenina del Sagrado Corazón in Lima

References

Lists of universities and colleges
 
Colleges